Joseph Stock (born 1789-died 30 October 1855) was an Irish Whig politician, barrister, Law Officer and judge. He was Serjeant-at-law and served as the Admiralty judge 1838-1855.

He was one of the ten children of Joseph Stock, Bishop of Killala and Achonry and his first wife Catherine Palmer (née Newcome) widow of Patrick Palmer and sister of William Newcome, Archbishop of Armagh.

He studied law at Trinity College Dublin and was called to the Bar in 1812. He became Third Serjeant-at-law (Ireland) in 1840, Second Serjeant in 1841 and First Serjeant in 1842.Unusually for a Serjeant-at-law he was also a sitting judge, having been appointed the judge of the Irish Admiralty Court in 1838. He served as the Admiralty judge until his death. His election to Parliament a few months later did not, as might have been expected, disqualify him from continuing as a judge, since the House of Commons Disqualification Act, barring judges from sitting in Parliament, did not, apparently through a drafting anomaly, apply to him. It was generally agreed that he was a highly qualified candidate, who had extensive experience in the field of Admiralty law, and his appointment was generally well received, apart from some concerns that he would not be an energetic reformer, since the Court was agreed by practitioners to be in desperate need of an overhaul. However his triple role as MP, Serjeant-at-law and judge meant that within a year or two he became very much a part-time judge. He delegated much of the work to subordinates, and began the previously unknown practice of delivering judgments ex tempore.

He lived at Temple Street, Dublin. He never married, and at his death, his substantial fortune was divided between his relatives.

References

External links
 

UK MPs 1837–1841
UK MPs 1841–1847
Whig (British political party) MPs for Irish constituencies
1855 deaths
Alumni of Trinity College Dublin
Serjeants-at-law (Ireland)
19th-century Irish judges
1789 births